Advice to the Lovelorn is a 1933 American pre-Code drama film directed by Alfred L. Werker and starring Lee Tracy, Sally Blane, Paul Harvey and Sterling Holloway. The film was released on December 1, 1933, by United Artists. It is based on the novel Miss Lonelyhearts  by Nathanael West with a number of changes made.

Synopsis
After Los Angeles reporter Toby Prentiss angers his editor by missing a major story due to being in a drunken stupor, he is assigned as punishment to take over the role of the retiring "Miss Lonelyhearts" advice column. Enraged but contractually-bound, Prentiss tries to get himself deliberately fired by writing a string of replies that offend conventional morality. Instead he proves to be a major success and becomes a syndicated national columnist. This causes considerable difficulties with his girlfriend Louise.

Cast 

Lee Tracy as Toby Prentiss
Sally Blane as Louise
Paul Harvey as Gaskell
Sterling Holloway as Benny
C. Henry Gordon as Kane
Isabel Jewell as Rose
 Jean Adair as Mrs. Prentiss 
 Clay Clement as 	Joseph C. Douglas, District Attorney 
 May Boley as Miss Lonelyhearts
 Matt Briggs as 	Richards 
 Judith Wood as 	Cora 
 Jimmy Conlin as 	California Booster 
 Adalyn Doyle as 	Miss Curtis 
 Ruth Fallows as 	Miss Howell 
 Wade Boteler as 	Federal Detective 
 Thomas E. Jackson as Federal Detective 
 Charles Lane as 	Circulation Manager 
 George Dobbs as Reporter
 Tom Herbert as Reporter 
 Franklyn Ardell as 	Reporter 
 Wilfred Lucas as Reporter 
 Wilbur Mack as 	Reporter 
 William H. Turner as Reporter 
 John Vosper as Reporter 
 Billy Wayne as 	Reporter 
 Bonnie Bannon as 	Girl

References

External links 
 

1933 films
American black-and-white films
Films directed by Alfred L. Werker
Films scored by Alfred Newman
United Artists films
Twentieth Century Pictures films
1933 drama films
American drama films
Films based on American novels
Films about journalists
1930s English-language films
1930s American films